Sarah Dyrehauge Hansen (born 14 September 1996) is a Danish footballer who plays as a midfielder for Rosenborg in the Toppserien and for the Denmark national team.

Club career
Hansen played for Vejle Boldklub until 2013 and then signed with IK Skovbakken. In 2014, she joined KoldingQ and since 2015, she has played for the first division Fortuna Hjørring. With this club, Hansen won the Danish championship and cup in the 2015–16 season.

International career
Hansen played for several Danish Youth Teams. First joining the U16 team in 2011 and in the same year debuting for the U17, where she became an important part of the team, playing important competitions, including the 2012 UEFA Under-17 European Championship, when Denmark finished third. On 29 July 2013, she debuted for the U-19 team in a friendly match against Norway. Hansen also played a pivotal role in this team, being part of the squad that represented Denmark at the 2013 UEFA European Under-19 Championship elite qualification, 2014 UEFA European Under-19 Championship elite round and 2015 UEFA European Under-19 Championship qualification.

On 22 January 2016, Hansen debuted for the Danish Senior Team in a friendly match against Netherlands. In the same year, she was part of the squad that played the 2016 Algarve Cup. She also represented Denmark at the 2017 Algarve Cup. While, still with the senior team, she played once for the Denmark U23 team in a match against Finland. In 2017, she was part of the group that represented Denmark at the UEFA European Championship 2017.

References

External links
 Player's Profile at Danish Football Association (DBU)
 
 Player's Profile at Euro Sport
 Player's Profile at UEFA

1996 births
Living people
Denmark women's youth international footballers
Denmark women's international footballers
Danish women's footballers
Vejle Boldklub players
Fortuna Hjørring players
FC Thy-Thisted Q players
Rosenborg BK Kvinner players
Toppserien players
Kolding IF players
Women's association football midfielders
Danish expatriate women's footballers
Expatriate women's footballers in Norway
Danish expatriate sportspeople in Norway
UEFA Women's Euro 2017 players

Denmark international footballers
Association football midfielders